Shilkinsky District is an administrative and municipal district (raion), one of the thirty-one in Zabaykalsky Krai, Russia. It is located in the center of the krai, and borders with Tungokochensky District in the north, Nerchinsky District in the east, Mogoytuysky District in the south, and with Karymsky District in the west. Its administrative center is the town of Shilka. Population:  47,453 (2002 Census);  The population of Shilka accounts for 32.3% of the district's total population.

History
The district was established on January 4, 1926.

References

Notes

Sources

Districts of Zabaykalsky Krai
States and territories established in 1926

